Agarkar is a surname. Notable people with the surname include:

 Gopal Ganesh Agarkar (1856–1895), Indian social reformer
 Ajit Agarkar (born 1977), Indian cricketer

Indian surnames